The Association of Bible Baptist Churches in Madagascar  (Malagasy: Fivondronan’ny Fiangonana Batista Biblika eto Madagasikara) is a Baptist Christian denomination, affiliated with the Baptist World Alliance, in Madagascar. The headquarters is in Ankadivato, Antananarivo, Madagascar.

History
The Association of Bible Baptist Churches in Madagascar has its origins in a foreign mission of the London Missionary Society in 1932. The Association was officially formed in 1963.  In 2006, it has 55 churches and 3,000 members. 

According to a denomination census released in 2020, it claimed 421 churches and 9,996 members.

Schools 
It is a partner of the Baptist Biblical Seminary of Madagascar in Antsirabe and the Faculty of Baptist Theology of Madagascar in Antananarivo.

Hospitals 
It is a partner of the Bonne Nouvelle Hospital in Mandritsara.

See also 
 Bible
 Born again
 Baptist beliefs
 Worship service (evangelicalism)
 Jesus Christ
 Believers' Church

References

External links
 Official Website

Baptist denominations in Africa
Churches in Madagascar
Evangelicalism in Madagascar